Avtovo CHP-15 provides electric and thermal energy to the Admiralteisky, Moskovsky, Kirovsky and Krasnoselsky Districts of St. Petersburg.

The director of station is Alexander Sidorov.

History 
It began operation on December 26, 1956.

Initially the station used coal, but towards the end of the 20th century TGC-1 began converting to gas. 
In connection with development of a gas powered station, physical deterioration and equipment obsolescence, reconstruction began in 2000 at the station.
 In 2000 the turbine unit number 3 was replaced.
 On December 28, 2007 the new turbine unit number 2, with an electric capacity of 30 MW, and thermal capacity of 75 GCal/h, began operation. Also the transformers and generator were replaced.
On August 23, 2009 there was a fire in the repaired unit.

References

External links 

 Avtovo TEC-15

TGC-1
Energy infrastructure completed in 1956
Natural gas-fired power stations in Russia
Cogeneration power stations in Russia
Power stations built in the Soviet Union